As of 2017, King County Metro operates the 10th largest fleet of buses in the United States, with a total of 1,540 buses.

Upon taking over transit operations on January 1, 1973, Metro used buses acquired from predecessor agencies Seattle Transit System and the Metropolitan Transit Company, still painted in their original colors. Metro acquired the 91-bus fleet of the Metropolitan Transit Company in December 1972 at a cost of $2.75 million. The first fleet of new  buses ordered by Metro arrived in June 1976, consisting of 145 diesel coaches manufactured by AM General. In 1978, Metro became the first large transit agency in North America to introduce articulated buses to its fleet, which required some bus stops to be rebuilt to accommodate  coaches. The fleet of 151 buses were manufactured by German maker MAN as part of a bulk order with other large U.S. transit agencies.

Vehicle types

In 1978, Metro was the first large transit agency to order high-capacity articulated buses (buses with a rotating joint). Today, King County Metro has one of the largest articulated fleets in North America (second only to MTA New York City Transit) and articulated buses account for about 42% of the agency's fleet.

In 1979, the agency ordered some of the first wheelchair lift equipped coaches in the nation, promising a completely new level of independence for disabled residents. Early lifts were severely flawed, but by the mid-1980s the lifts were generally reliable and were ordered on all new buses. Metro's entire fleet has been wheelchair-accessible since 1999.

Metro was reluctant to adopt low-floor buses, not buying any until 2003. Low-floor coaches have slightly reduced seating capacity (because the wheelwells intrude further into the passenger compartment) which may have been a concern. Whatever the reason for the delay, Metro has now embraced low-floor buses and all new fleet additions since 2003 have been low-floor and the last high-floor buses were retired in March 2020.

Trolleys

Metro maintains a fleet of electric trolleybuses that serve 15 routes along almost 70 miles of two-direction overhead wire. This is the second largest trolleybus system in the United States by ridership and fleet size.  The trolleybuses are valued by Metro both as zero-emission vehicles, and as vehicles well adapted to Seattle's hilly terrain.

Metro's trolleybus fleet consists of 174 entirely low-floor New Flyer Xcelsior coaches.

Occasionally Metro will use diesel or diesel-electric hybrid coaches on trolley routes. Reasons for doing this include construction (weekends only), overhead wire maintenance or events that require coaches to go long distances off-route, "coach changes" (replacing a bus in service that has developed a problem) or to add temporary additional capacity. The latter two cases sometimes lead to diesel buses being used, in order to get the replacement or supplementary vehicle into service as quickly as possible; diesel buses can reach the point of entry into service faster, as they do not need to follow the overhead wires when deadheading.

Diesel-electric hybrids

Metro operates the largest fleet of hybrid buses in the country. The first hybrid buses were purchased in 2004 for use with routes that operated in the Downtown Seattle Transit Tunnel. The National Renewable Energy Laboratory conducted a one-year comparative study between conventional diesel and hybrid-powered buses operating on a typical King County drive cycle. Results showed that the hybrid powered buses lowered fuel consumption by 23%; NOx by 18%; carbon monoxide (CO) by 60%; and total hydrocarbon (THC) by 56% when compared to conventional diesel buses. Those results have led Metro to purchase hybrid buses exclusively since 2005 (with the exception of the all-electric trolley buses). Metro now has over 700 hybrid buses in the fleet, with more on order.

Hush mode
Buses equipped with the GM-Allison EP50 and the Allison H 50 EP parallel hybrid systems had a special "hush mode" that allowed the buses to operate solely on electric power, reducing tailpipe emissions and noise while operating in the Downtown Seattle Transit Tunnel. Before entering the tunnel, the operator pushed a button that put the coach into hush mode. While buses were inside stations, the coaches operated solely on electric propulsion (although, while the doors are closed, the engine still rotates in order to operate auxiliary loads). The operation of the diesel engine allowed the batteries to recharge. Hush mode would normally be deactivated by the operator as they exited the tunnel, but the mode will be automatically deactivated after the coach had traveled a certain distance.

Buses have not operated in the tunnel since March 23, 2019.

Series hybrids

Metro's newest buses are equipped with the BAE Systems HybriDrive, a series hybrid system. In these buses an electric motor turns the wheels, with power provided by a generator attached to a diesel engine and regenerative braking. Any excess power is stored in batteries on the roof of the bus. Because the diesel engine is not directly propelling the bus, it can operate at a more steady, fuel-efficient speed.

Buses delivered after 2014 are equipped with the upgraded HybriDrive Series-E which uses electrically powered accessory systems (alternator, air conditioning, air compressor, cooling fans and steering pump) to increase fuel efficiency and allow the diesel engine to stop when the bus is stopped and the batteries are sufficiently charged.

Battery electric buses
Metro began testing three new Proterra Catalyst battery electric buses in 2015.  The coaches are capable of traveling over 26 miles before the battery needs to be recharged. A special fast charge station located at the Eastgate Park and Ride allow the bus to be fully recharged in under 10 minutes, during the driver's normally scheduled layover. These new vehicles get the equivalent of 20.8 MPG, which is over 6 times better than the 3.18 MPG seen on Metro's series hybrid electric coaches. The coaches were purchased with support from a $4.7 million Federal Transit Administration grant and entered revenue service on February 17, 2016. They operate on shorter routes (due to their limited range) on the eastside, specifically Routes 226 and 241.  Metro has committed to purchasing 120 electric buses with the option to purchase up to 80 additional vehicles by 2020. In 2017 and 2018, Metro tested electric buses with ranges of 140 miles from several manufacturers, and plans to have a zero-emissions bus fleet by 2040.

Historic preservation
Metro has a special fleet of more than a dozen historic motor buses and trolleybuses ranging from ones built in the late 1930s and early 1940s through to ones only recently retired. The coaches are restored, maintained and operated under an agreement with the Metro Employees Historic Vehicle Association (MEHVA), a non-profit organization formed in 1981. Metro maintains ownership of the historic fleet, providing coverage under its fleet self-insurance along with storage, work space and parts on an as available basis.

Money to operate the coaches and purchase parts not in Metro stock is generated by selling tickets to public excursions. The first trips took place in 1984, and nowadays MEHVA typically operates six to eight per year. Each excursion has a different route and a different emphasis.

MEHVA was established in 1981, as Metro prepared to retire trolleybuses that had been operating in Seattle since the 1940s. Since that time, MEHVA acquired other retired transit vehicles which were formerly operated in King County. Often these retired coaches were purchased by private citizens and left on the owner's property for many decades, leaving them in need of restoration. The collection of vehicles has gradually expanded over time, with the addition of newly retired buses when deemed historically notable and not yet represented in the collection.

Current fleet roster

Future fleet

Historic fleet 
These historic buses are owned by King County Metro, but are restored, maintained and operated by unpaid volunteers who are in the Metro Employee Historic Vehicle Association (MEHVA).

In addition, No. 4020, one of the MAN SG-T 310 articulated trolleybuses, was donated to and preserved at the Illinois Railway Museum (IRM) in 2008 through the efforts of MEHVA. It was part of the first fleet of articulated trolleybuses to operate in America.

Retired fleet 
See Trolleybuses in Seattle for a detailed history of Seattle's trolleybus fleet.

See also
 Sound Transit
 Trolleybuses in Seattle

References

External links
 Metro Vehicles page on King County Metro website

Bus transportation in Washington (state)
Transportation in King County, Washington
Transportation in Seattle
fleet
Bus-related lists